Hitchin' a Ride may refer to:

 The act of hitchhiking
 "Hitchin' a Ride" (Green Day song)
 "Hitchin' a Ride" (Vanity Fare song)